Pieces of Africa is a 1992 studio album by the Kronos Quartet, containing works commissioned by the quartet, written by seven African composers.

Track listing

Critical reception
According to AllMusic the Quartet avoids cultural imperialism or appropriation and, "Pieces of Africa teems with beguiling melodies, making it one of this quartet's more accessible projects and also one of its best." A review in Gramophone argues that only Escalay and White Man Sleeps are successful compositions for string quartet.

Personnel

Musicians
David Harrington – violin, akete
John Sherba – violin, akete
Hank Dutt – viola, akete
Joan Jeanrenaud – cello, akete
Oakland Interfaith Gospel Choir, Terrence Kelly – conductor
Hassan Hakmoun, Said Hakmoun, Radouane Laktib, Dumisani Maraire – voice
Obo Addy – drums
Hamza El Din – tar
Radouane Laktib – oud
Foday Musa Suso – kora
Said Hakmoun – bendir
Ephat Mujuru – mbira
Dan Pauli – hosho

Production
 Bob Edwards, Judith Sherman, Paul Zinman – Engineers
 Judith Sherman – Producer

See also
List of 1992 albums

Sales

References 

1992 classical albums
Kronos Quartet albums
Nonesuch Records albums